Sachkhere (Saçxeris municiṗaliṫeṫi) is a district of Georgia, in the region of Imereti. Its main town is Sachkhere.

Settlements

Politics
Sachkhere Municipal Assembly (Georgian: საჩხერის საკრებულო, Sachkheris Sakrebulo) is a representative body in Sachkhere Municipality, consisting of 33 members and elected every four years. The last election was held in October 2021.

Gallery

See also 
 List of municipalities in Georgia (country)

References

External links 
 Districts of Georgia, Statoids.com

Municipalities of Imereti